The Jinjue Mosque is a mosque in Qinhuai District, Nanjing City, Jiangsu Province, China.

History
The mosque was constructed under the order of Hongwu Emperor of Ming Dynasty in 1388. The construction of the mosque was completed in 1392. During the Xuande Emperor rule, Zheng He appealed for the mosque to undergo renovation and the first significant repairs took place in 1430 after it was destroyed by fire shortly before. Further expansion and repairs were commissioned by the Jiajing Emperor in the mid-sixteenth century. Other repairs occurred in 1492, 1877, 1879, 1957, 1982, 1984, and 2002. By the late 19th century, the mosque was reduced from being originally 264 acres to a mere 1650 square meters in consequence of the Taiping Rebellion and to reduce the taxes owed by the mosque. The current structure was constructed in the late Qing Dynasty and its area has been reduced to 0.4 hectares. In 2007, the mosque underwent reparation and renovation with the support of Nanjing municipal government. In 2014, the government added the adjacent primary school into the mosque area, thus doubling its area.

Architecture  
Jinjue Mosque is elaborately styled in a Sino-Islamic fashion. The three-entry gate has an imitation imperial tablet in the top center that reads "bestowed by imperial order" and below that it reads "Jingjuesi" (the name of the mosque). The mosque has several courtyards, a reception room, an ablutions chamber, an antechamber, guest quarters, a prayer hall, a kitchen, and a mihrab located at the western end of the mosque.

Transportation
The mosque is accessible within walking distance north east of Sanshanjie Station of Nanjing Metro.

See also
 Islam in China
 List of mosques in China

References

1388 establishments in Asia
14th-century establishments in China
Ming dynasty architecture
Mosques completed in 1388
Mosques in Nanjing